Antti-Jukka Paarma (born 1 December 1942 in Lappeenranta) was the Archbishop of Turku and Finland, and the spiritual head of the Evangelical Lutheran Church of Finland. He retired as Archbishop on 1 June 2010.

References

External links

1942 births
Living people
People from Lappeenranta
Lutheran archbishops and bishops of Turku
20th-century Lutheran archbishops
21st-century Lutheran archbishops